Sračinec is a village and municipality in Croatia in Varaždin county. According to the 2011 census, there are 4,842 inhabitants, an absolute majority of which are Croats.
The municipality includes the following settlements:
 Sračinec, population 3,897
 Svibovec Podravski, population 945

References

Municipalities of Croatia
Populated places in Varaždin County